Avery House may refer to:
Avery House, a dormitory within the House System at the California Institute of Technology
Avery House (Fort Collins, Colorado), a National Register of Historic Places listing in Larimer County, Colorado
Avery House (Griswold, Connecticut)
Ebenezer Avery House, a historic house museum in Fort Griswold Battlefield State Park
Thomas Avery House, East Lyme, Connecticut
Capt. Salem Avery House, Shady Side, Maryland
Alphonse Calhoun Avery House, Morganton, North Carolina
Carlos Avery House, Wellington, Ohio
Avery House (Dayton, Oregon), a National Register of Historic Places listing in Yamhill County, Oregon
Avery House (Frankfort, Indiana), an Indiana Register of Historic Sites and Structures listing in Frankfort, Indiana

See also
Avery Homestead, Ledyard, Connecticut
Avery Farmhouse, Duanesburg, New York
Avery-Hunter House, Granville, Ohio

Architectural disambiguation pages